Paul, son of Peter (died after 1222) was a Hungarian distinguished nobleman, who served as voivode of Transylvania between 1221 and 1222, during the reign of Andrew II of Hungary. The first known vice-voivode, Bocha held the office in 1221, during Paul's reign.

Before his voivodeship, Paul served as ispán (comes) of Csanád County from 1220 to 1221.

References

Sources
 Engel, Pál (2001). The Realm of St Stephen: A History of Medieval Hungary, 895-1526. I.B. Tauris Publishers. .
 Kristó, Gyula (2003). Early Transylvania (895–1324). Lucidus Kiadó. .
  Markó, László (2006). A magyar állam főméltóságai Szent Istvántól napjainkig – Életrajzi Lexikon ("The High Officers of the Hungarian State from Saint Stephen to the Present Days – A Biographical Encyclopedia") (2nd edition); Helikon Kiadó Kft., Budapest; .
  Zsoldos, Attila (2011). Magyarország világi archontológiája, 1000–1301 ("Secular Archontology of Hungary, 1000–1301"). História, MTA Történettudományi Intézete. Budapest. 

Voivodes of Transylvania
13th-century Hungarian people